Hubert Birkenmeier (born 24 May 1949 in Hartheim am Rhein) is a retired German professional footballer who played professionally in Germany, the North American Soccer League, Major Indoor Soccer League and American Soccer League. His greatest success came with the New York Cosmos in the NASL.

Career
Birkenmeier began his career in West Germany. In 1970, he signed with Freiburger FC before moving to Tennis Borussia Berlin in 1972. He remained in Berlin until 1977 when the Cosmos of the North American Soccer League purchased his contract. At the time he could not speak English. Birkenmeier remained with the Cosmos until 1985. During those years, he played eight outdoor NASL, two indoor NASL and one Major Indoor Soccer League season. During those years, Birkenmeier was a First Team NASL All Star selection in 1982 and 1984, a Second Teamer in 1981 and an Honorable Mention in 1983. Birkenmeier was the Cosmos' starting goalie for three consecutive Soccer Bowls ('80, '81 & '82), and did not concede a goal in any of them. In 1985, he also played several exhibition games for the Cosmos. In August 1985, he signed with the Chicago Sting of the MISL. He spent most of the season as a backup for Victor Nogueira. The Sting waived him on 29 April 1986. On 4 November 1986, Birkenmeier signed with the expansion New York Express of the MISL. The Express folded two-thirds of the way through the season and on 6 March 1987, the Los Angeles Lazers signed him to a ten-day contract. He then played for the Cosmopolitan Eagles during the 1987 outdoor exhibition season. In 1988, he played for the New York Pancyprian-Freedoms of the Cosmopolitan Soccer League as it went to the semifinals of the National Challenge Cup. He returned signed with the New York Eagles of the American Soccer League. He remained with them through the 1990 season in the American Professional Soccer League.

Retirement from professional soccer
Birkenmeier now manages a sporting goods store called Birkenmeier Sport Shop in Hackensack, New Jersey. The store was founded and originally owned by Birkenmeier but was sold in 1985 to his former Cosmos teammate Andranik Eskandarian when Birkenmeier left to play for the Chicago Sting. The teammates helped teach Eksandarian's son, Alecko, how to play inside the store. He also is now a goalkeeping coach for World Class FC

Current activities
On a visit back to his hometown of Hartheim in 2009 to celebrate his 60th Birthday, he described initially having mixed feelings about leaving Germany to play in the United States. He stated that in his first few months as a Cosmo, he lived in a hotel and had some difficulty with both homesickness and the learning of a new language. However, he credits his teammate and fellow countryman, Franz Beckenbauer with helping him adjust quickly to his new home, team and language, helping him to become one of the team's most dependable and popular players while sharing in two NASL Championships. Birkenmeier continues to manage the sporting goods store he founded but stays involved in the sport acting as goalkeeping coach with the U.S. Youth National Team. He also runs a soccer youth camp for seven weeks each summer in Northern New Jersey. In the same interview, he stated that he goes back home to Hartheim every year to visit his brother and sister and stays abreast of hometown news via the internet.

References

External links
 NASL career stats
 

1949 births
Living people
People from Breisgau-Hochschwarzwald
American Professional Soccer League players
American Soccer League (1988–89) players
American soccer players
Association football goalkeepers
Chicago Sting (MISL) players
Expatriate soccer players in the United States
Bundesliga players
2. Bundesliga players
Cosmopolitan Soccer League players
German footballers
German emigrants to the United States
Los Angeles Lazers players
Major Indoor Soccer League (1978–1992) players
North American Soccer League (1968–1984) indoor players
New Jersey Eagles players
New York Express players
New York Cosmos players
New York Cosmos (MISL) players
North American Soccer League (1968–1984) players
Tennis Borussia Berlin players
West German expatriate footballers
West German expatriate sportspeople in the United States
West German footballers
New York Pancyprian-Freedoms players
Footballers from Baden-Württemberg
Association football player-managers
Freiburger FC players
Sportspeople from Freiburg (region)